The Arey Tatush is a Russian paramotor that was designed and produced by Arey of Krasnoyarsk for powered paragliding. Now out of production, when it was available the aircraft was supplied complete and ready-to-fly.

Design and development
The Tatush was designed to comply with the US FAR 103 Ultralight Vehicles rules as well as European regulations. It features a paraglider-style wing, single-place accommodation and a single engine in pusher configuration with a  diameter two-bladed wooden propeller.

The base model T120M uses the inexpensive  Russian-made Arey A-170 in-house engine, although options include the  Hirth F33 and the  Solo 210 on upgraded models.

As is the case with all paramotors, take-off and landing is accomplished by foot. Inflight steering is accomplished via handles that actuate the canopy brakes, creating roll and yaw.

Variants
Tatush T120M
Model with a Russian-made  Arey A-170 engine with a 2.5:1 ratio reduction drive and a  diameter two-bladed wooden propeller.
Tatush T210S
Model with a  Solo 210 engine  with a 2.5:1 ratio reduction drive and a  diameter two-bladed wooden propeller.
Tatush T300
Model with a  Hirth F33 engine with a 1.9:1 ratio reduction drive and a  diameter two-bladed wooden propeller.
Telezhka
A powered parachute design, in the form of a lightweight wheel set to be combined with the Tatush.

Specifications (Tatush T120M)

References

Tatush
2000s Russian ultralight aircraft
Single-engined pusher aircraft
Paramotors